Adolphe-André Porée, known as Chanoine Porée (14 March 1848, Bernay – 28 February 1939, Saint-Aubin-d'Écrosville), was a French archaeologist and historian.

Originally from Beaumont-en-Auge, his father, Adolphe Porée, ran a dyeing factory in Bernay. A very religious individual, Porée embraced the priesthood at the age of twenty-three. In 1871, he became the curé of the collegiate church of Les Andelys. In 1875, he became the curé of Bournainville-Faverolles where he remained fifty-three years. Porée spent his nights studying archeology, with particular attention paid to the churches of Eure sold during the First Empire, local notables and the impact of the French Revolution.

Porée, who also was the diocesan archivist, undertook, from 1890 to 1892, an archaeological expedition through France, Belgium, Germany, Switzerland and Italy.

In 1882, he discovered, along with the abbé de La Balle and Gaston Le Breton, a lost statue by Pierre Puget on the old La Londe castle grounds at Biéville-Beuville. This statue of Hercules slaying the Hydra of Lerna, which was originally in the Château du Vaudreuil, is now at the Musée des Beaux-Arts de Rouen.

A disciple of Auguste Le Prévost and Leopold Delisle, he was the director of the Société des Antiquaires de Normandie, a corresponding member of the Académie des Inscriptions et Belles-Lettres and an Officer of Public Instruction. He was awarded the Legion of Honor in 1926.

Porée's Histoire de l'Abbaye du Bec is his magnum opus. Several streets were named after him, in Bec-Hellouin, Bournainville-Faverolles, Pont-Audemer and Bernay. In 1964, a plaque honoring his memory was erected in the cemetery of Bournainville. In 2000, a local former rectory (now the Town Hall) was converted into a Porée museum.

Selected works

References

Sources 
 Bulletin de la Société des antiquaires de Normandie, vol. 46-47, Société des antiquaires de Normandie, Caen, 1939, p. 15 passim.

French archaeologists
19th-century French historians
20th-century French historians
Chevaliers of the Légion d'honneur
Corresponding members of the Académie des Inscriptions et Belles-Lettres
People from Bernay, Eure
1848 births
1939 deaths
19th-century French male writers
French male non-fiction writers